Roland Schwarz may refer to:
 Roland Schwarz (sailor)
 Roland Schwarz (wrestler)